Board certification may refer to:
 Board certification, for physicians in an area of medical specialization.
 Nursing board certification, for nurses who obtain additional specialty training.
 Some other Professional certifications are called "board certifications", such as ASIS International's Certified Protection Professional board certification.